Lahore Music forum (LMF) is a non profit organisation established in Lahore in the year 2011 for supporting classical musicians and to raise the musical standards of classical music in Pakistan.

Impact

The Lahore Music forum since its inception has played a key role in providing a platform for upcoming artists, provided access to other artists and maestros, exposure to artists via social media and created a focal point for music lovers and connoisseurs to come together to support classical music.

References

Non-profit organisations based in Pakistan